A salt substitute, also known as low-sodium salt, is a low-sodium alternative to edible salt (table salt) marketed to circumvent the risk of high blood pressure and cardiovascular disease associated with a high intake of sodium chloride while maintaining a similar taste.

The leading salt substitutes are non-sodium table salts, which have their tastes as a result of compounds other than sodium chloride. Non-sodium salts reduce daily sodium intake and reduce the health effects of this element.

Low sodium diet 

According to current WHO guidelines, adults should consume less than 2,000 mg of sodium per day (i.e. about 5 grams of traditional table salt), and at least 3,510 mg of potassium per day. In Europe, adults and children consume about twice as much sodium as recommended by experts.

Examples

Potassium 

Potassium closely resembles the saltiness of sodium. In practice, potassium chloride (also known as potassium salt) is the most commonly used salt substitute. Potassium lactate may also be used to reduce sodium levels in food products and is commonly used in meat and poultry products. The recommended daily allowance of potassium is higher than that for sodium, yet a typical person consumes less potassium than sodium in a given day. Potassium chloride has a bitter aftertaste when used in higher proportions, which consumers may find unpalatable. As a result, some formulations only replace half the sodium chloride with potassium.

Various diseases and medications may decrease the body's excretion of potassium, thereby increasing the risk of potentially fatal hyperkalemia. People with kidney failure, heart failure, or diabetes are not recommended to use salt substitutes without medical advice. LoSalt, a salt substitute manufacturer, has issued an advisory statement that people taking the following prescription drugs should not use a salt substitute: amiloride, triamterene, Dytac, captopril and other angiotensin-converting enzyme inhibitors, spironolactone, and eplerenone.

Other types 
Sodium malate is salty in taste and may be blended with other salt substitutes. Although it contains sodium, the mass fraction is lower.

Monosodium glutamate is often used as a substitute to salt in processed and restaurant food, due to its salty taste, and low sodium content compared to table salt, although it can also be used effectively in home cooking.

Seaweed granules are also marketed as alternatives to salt.

Dehydrated, pulverized salicornia (glasswort, marsh samphire) is sold under the brand name "Green Salt" as a salt substitute claimed to be as salty in taste as table salt, but with less sodium.

Historical 

Historically (late 20th century), many substances containing magnesium and potassium have been tried as salt substitutes. They include:

 carnallite (KMgCl3•6H2O)
 kainite (KCl•MgSO4•2H2O)
 langbeinite (K2Mg2(SO4)2)
 sylvite (KCl) – currently used
 polyhalite (K2MgCa2(SO4)4•2H2O)
 Epsomite
 kieserite

Even further back in the early 20th century, lithium chloride was used as a salt substitute for those with hypertension. Unfortunately, however, overdosing was common and deaths have occurred, leading to its prohibition in 1949.

Additives 

Flavor enhancers, although not true salt alternatives, help reduce the use of salt by enhancing the savory flavor. Hydrolyzed protein or 5'-nucleotides are sometimes added to potassium chloride to improve the flavour of salt substitutes.

Salt substitutes can also be further enriched with the essential nutrients. A salt substitute can, analogously to the problem of iodine deficiency, help to eliminate the "hidden hunger" i.e. insufficient supply of necessary micronutrients such as iron. Such substances are promoted by UNICEF as a "super-salt".

See also 

 Sugar substitute
 Milk substitute

References 

Edible salt
Potassium compounds
Imitation foods